The Canal maritime de Marans à la mer is a canal on France's western shore that connects the Sèvre Niortaise in Marans to the Sèvre Niortaise in Charron. Also known as the Canal Maritime du Brault and Canal de Marans à la Mer, the canal is located in the Charente-Maritime department.

See also
List of canals in France

References

Marans